The 17th/21st Lancers was a cavalry regiment of the British Army. It was formed in England by the amalgamation of the 17th Lancers and the 21st Lancers in 1922 and, after service in the Second World War, it amalgamated with the 16th/5th The Queen's Royal Lancers to form the Queen's Royal Lancers in 1993.

History

Second World War
The regiment was formed in England during the interwar period by the amalgamation of the 17th Lancers and the 21st Lancers on 27 June 1922. The regiment was deployed to Meerut in India in 1936 and it was mechanised in 1938.

On the outbreak of the Second World War, in September 1939, the regiment transferred back to the United Kingdom and became part of the 1st Motor Machine Gun Brigade defending south-east England. On 12 October 1940, the 1st Motor Machine Gun Brigade became the 26th Armoured Brigade. On 9 November 1940, the brigade became part of the newly raised 6th Armoured Division, with which it served for the rest of the war. Some personnel from the regiment were detached in December to help form the cadre of the 24th Lancers.

In November 1942, the division was deployed to Tunisia for Operation Torch. Now equipped with Valentine Mk III and Crusader Mk III tanks, the regiment saw action in the Tunisia Campaign for some time, including taking heavy losses defending Thala in the Battle of Kasserine Pass in February 1943 during which fourteen tanks were put out of action. After this, the regiment was withdrawn and refitted with M4A2 Sherman tanks. In April, the regiment attempted to take the Fondouk Pass during which thirty-two tanks were put out of action. The campaign in Tunisia came to an end in May 1943, with the surrender of almost 250,000 German and Italian soldiers who subsequently became prisoners of war (POWs). Most of the 6th Armoured Division (minus the 1st Guards Brigade) then deployed to the Italian Front in March 1944, and fought to breach the Gustav Line, taking part in Operation Diadem, the fourth and final Battle of Monte Cassino. The regiment advanced to the Gothic Line, and spent the winter there—at points, serving as infantry rather than as an armoured unit, due to the static nature of the trench warfare there. After the final breakthrough in April 1945, codenamed Operation Grapeshot, the regiment ended the war in Austria.

Post-war
In October 1946, the regiment was posted to Greece on internal security duties. In October 1947, it deployed to the Suez Canal Zone and re-equipped as an armoured car regiment; it then moved to Palestine in 1948. The regiment returned home to Catterick Garrison later that year as RAC Training Regiment and then joined 20th Armoured Brigade and moved to York Barracks at Münster in December 1951. It transferred to 4th Guards Brigade Group and moved to Barker Barracks in Paderborn in August 1957. After briefly returning home in December 1959, it moved to Hong Kong in March 1960 from where it deployed units to Aden in October 1961.

The regiment joined 20th Armoured Brigade Group and moved to Athlone Barracks at Sennelager in December 1962. After that it moved to Lisanelly Camp in Omagh in March 1968 from where it deployed a squadron to Libya in 1970. It then transferred to 4th Armoured Brigade and moved to Northampton Barracks in Wolfenbüttel in November 1972 from where it deployed units to Northern Ireland at the height of the Troubles. It transferred to 11th Armoured Brigade and moved to Wessex Barracks in Bad Fallingbostel in October 1974 from where it again deployed units to Northern Ireland. It returned home re-locating to Bovington Camp as RAC Centre Regiment in December 1977 and then went back to West Germany to join 4th Armoured Brigade becoming based at Swinton Barracks in Münster in November 1980. A squadron was sent to Northern Ireland to undertake guard duties at the Maze Prison in December 1982.

After deploying two squadrons to the Persian Gulf in September 1990 for the Gulf War, the regiment returned to the United Kingdom later in the year. In 1993, with the reductions in forces after the end of the Cold War, the regiment was amalgamated with the 16th/5th The Queen's Royal Lancers to form the Queen's Royal Lancers.

Commanding Officers

Commanding Officers of the regiment have included:
1958–1961: Lt Col Richard G. Satterthwaite
1961–1963: Lt Col Robert D.A. Renton
1963–1966: Lt Col Robert H.A. Cockburn
1966–1968: Lt Col Richard L.C. Tamplin
1968–1970: Lt Col Charles P.M. Mulloy
1970–1973: Lt Col John W. Turner
1973–1975: Lt Col Arthur R. Douglas-Nugent
1975–1977: Lt Col Nigel M. Still
1977–1979: Lt Col R. Shaun Longsdon
1979–1981: Lt Col Richard H. Swinburn
1981–1984: Lt Col Brian G. Hamilton-Russell
1984–1985: Lt Col Reginald I.S. Purbrick
1985–1988: Lt Col William J. Hurrell
1988–1990: Lt Col Andrew A.J.R. Cumming
1990–1992: Lt Col Robert D.S. Gordon
1992–1993: Lt Col Robert A. McKenzie-Johnston

Colonel-in-Chief
1969–1993: Princess Alexandra, LG, GCVO

Regimental Colonels
Regimental colonels were:

1922–1926 (17th Lancers): F.M. Sir Douglas Haig, 1st Earl Haig, KT, OM, GCB, GCMG, GCVO, KCIE 
1922–1938 (21st Lancers): Gen. Sir Herbert Alexander Lawrence, GCB
1938–1947: Lt-Gen. Sir Bertie Drew Fisher, KCB, CMG, DSO
1947–1957: F.M. Sir Richard Amyatt Hull, GCB, DSO 
1957–1965: Brig. Richard Gustavus Hamilton-Russell, DSO
1965–1975: Maj-Gen. Ronald Edward Coaker, CB, CBE, MC
1975–1983: Col. Michael Colvin Watson, OBE, MC, DL
1983–1988: Brig. John Warner Turner
1988–1993: Col. Robert Shaun Longsdon
''1993 Regiment amalgamated with 16th/5th The Queen's Royal Lancers to form The Queen's Royal Lancers

Alliances
The regiment's alliances included:
 British Ceylon - Ceylon Mounted Rifles
 - Lord Strathcona's Horse (Royal Canadians)

References

17 Lancers
Military units and formations established in 1922
Lancers 017 021
Military units and formations disestablished in 1993